Karchapeswarar Temple is a Hindu temple located in the town of Kanchipuram in Tamil Nadu, India.

Vaippu Sthalam
In Kaccippalathali more than one temple of Kancheepuram has been referred as the Vaippu Sthalams by Tamil Saivite Nayanar Appar. They are as under:
 Kaccapesam, Kailayam and Kayokaranam  
 Tirumetrazhi, Onakanthanthazhi, Tirukamakottai and Kacchineri Karikkadu.

Kaccapesam
The presiding deity of Kaccapesam is known as Karchapeswarar or Kaccapesvarar.

Folklore
According to popular folklore, Vishnu is believed to have worshipped Shiva in the form of kurma (tortoise). The other name given to the temple is Kachipedu in some inscriptions.  The temple is adjacent to the Kanthakottam temple. The temples was constructed by the Pallavas and renovated by Vijayanagar kings.

Notes

Nearest Hindu Temple
Arulmigu Thirumagaraleeswar Temple, Magaral

Gallery

 

Hindu temples in Kanchipuram
Shiva temples in Kanchipuram district